Nanchang South railway station, located in the Qingyunpu District, Nanchang, Jiangxi, China, is a station on the Beijing–Kowloon railway and terminus station on the Nanchang Steel Plant Branch Line.

History
The station opened in 1958, originally as both a passenger and freight station, but as the speed of trains increased, passenger services were abandoned. The station now sees only freight services. The station is named Qingyunpu railway station between 1962 and 2008. It renamed to Nanchang South railway station in 2008.

Public transportation
There are four bus services, bus services No. 15, 16, 203 and 236.

Platforms
The station has two platforms: one island platform and one bay platform.

References 

Stations on the Beijing–Kowloon Railway
Railway stations in Jiangxi
Railway stations in China opened in 1958
Transport in Nanchang